Willard Cates Jr. (November 16, 1942 – March 17, 2016) was an American epidemiologist and public health advocate known for his work on HIV/AIDS and women's health. In 1974, he began working at the Epidemic Intelligence Service of the Centers for Disease Control and Prevention (CDC), where he researched the epidemiology of abortion. He served as director of the CDC's Division of Sexually Transmitted Diseases from 1982 to 1992. In 1994, he began working at FHI 360, where he became president of the Institute for Family Health in 1998. He was a member of the Institute of Medicine and served as president of both the Society for Epidemiologic Research and the Association of Reproductive Health Professionals.

References

External links

1942 births
2016 deaths
Deaths from leiomyosarcoma
Deaths from cancer in North Carolina
People from Cleveland
Yale School of Medicine alumni
Centers for Disease Control and Prevention people
American epidemiologists
American public health doctors
Members of the National Academy of Medicine
Yale School of Public Health alumni